The ship that became Mary Ann (or Mary Anne) was built in 1772 in France and the British captured her c. 1778. Her name may have been Ariadne until 1786 when she started to engage in whaling. Next, as Mary Ann, she made one voyage transporting convicts to New South Wales from England. In 1794 the French captured her, but by 1797 she was back in her owners' hands. She then made a slave trading voyage. Next, she became a West Indiaman, trading between London or Liverpool to Demerara. It was on one of those voyages in November 1801 that a French privateer captured her.

Whaling
Mary Ann entered Lloyd's Register (LR) in 1786 with J. Calwell, master. Her owner was  Stephens, and trade London—Greenland. Under Captain Stewart she was in the Greenland Fishery.

Alternatively, in 1786 her owners were Hattersley & Co., and her master was Captain Stephen Skiff. That year she engaged in whaling in the South Seas Fishery.

Lloyd's Register for 1787 had her master changing to Stewart, and then Stephen Skiff. It showed her trade changing from London—Greenland to London—South Seas. 

In 1787 she sailed to the Brazil Banks. She was under Captain S. Skiff, with owners Stephens & Co, or Hattersley & Co. She returned on 19 July 1789 with 20 tuns sperm oil, 180 tuns whale oil, and 140 cwt bone.

In 1790 Mary Ann was again in the Fishery. Then in 1791 she underwent a "good repair".

Convict transport 
In 1791 she transported convicts from England to Australia and was under the command of Captain Mark Munroe. She departed Portsmouth on 16 February 1791 and arrived on 9 July in Port Jackson, New South Wales. She sailed independently, her voyage taking place between the second and the third fleets. She embarked 150 female convicts, nine of whom died during the voyage.

She sailed from Port Jackson in November and sailed as far as 45° South, but returned, not having seen any whales.

On her return to New South Wales Governor Arthur Phillip chartered her for voyages to Norfolk Island. She then sailed to the coast of Peru and Chile on a whaling voyage, calling at Valparaiso. From there she returned to England via Rio de Janeiro, where she stopped in March 1793, before arriving at London in on 24 May. She returned with 25 tons of sperm oil, eight tons of whale oil, and 1,900 seal skins.

From 1792 on, Lloyd's Register gives Mary Anns owner as  "Capt & Co."

Subsequent career
Lloyd's Register continues to show Munroe as master and her trade as London—Botany Bay until 1797. In 1797 Mary Anns master changes to Curry, her owner changes to Calvert & Co., and her trade becomes London−Africa.

Capture
It is likely that actually Currie assumed command much earlier. Mary Ann had been on her way from Tobago to London.

It is not clear when and how Mary Ann was restored to her owners, but it is clear from the data in Lloyd's Register for 1797 that she was.

Enslaving voyage
Captain Robert Currie received a letter of marque on 16 October 1797. Currie sailed Mary Ann from London on 5 November 1797, bound for the Gold Coast. She embarked captives at Cape Coast Castle. She arrived at Demerara on 27 September 1798, with 407 captives.

Merchantman
The 1800 volume of the Register of Shipping shows May Anns owner changing to A.M.McNab, her master to Jones, and her trade becoming London and Liverpool to Demerara.

Fate
Lloyd's Register for 1803 shows Mary Anns master as F. Paul, with her trade still Liverpool—Demerara.

Mary Ann had been sailing from Liverpool via Madeira to Demerara.

Notes

Citations

References

See also
Mary Ann

1772 ships
Ships of the Third Fleet
Whaling ships
Sealing ships
Age of Sail merchant ships
Merchant ships of the United Kingdom
London slave ships
Captured ships